Glimmerglass Historic District is a national historic district located near Cooperstown in Otsego County, New York.  The  district encompasses parts of three towns, Otsego, Springfield, and Middlefield and the village of Cooperstown.  It encompasses the physical and social sphere of Otsego Lake and its immediate environs.  It includes 1,475 contributing features, some of which were previously listed including the Cooperstown Historic District, U.S. Post Office (Cooperstown, New York), and Hyde Hall in Glimmerglass State Park.

It was listed on the National Register of Historic Places in 1999.

References

Historic districts on the National Register of Historic Places in New York (state)
Historic districts in Otsego County, New York
National Register of Historic Places in Otsego County, New York